Daniello Marco Dolfino or Daniel Marc Delfin (born 5 October 1653 in Venice, then in the Republic of Venice and died in Brescia on 5 August 1704) is an Italian cardinal of the late seventeenth and early eighteenth century and member of the noble family Delfin. He is a grand-nephew of Cardinal Giovanni Delfino (seniore) (1604) and a nephew of Cardinal Giovanni Delfino (iuniore) (1667).

Biography
Dolfino performs functions in the Roman Curia, including as a referendum to the Supreme Court of the Apostolic Signatura. He was vice-legate at Avignon from 1692 to 1696. He was elected titular archbishop of Damascus and sent as apostolic nuncio to France in 1696. Delfin was transferred to the diocese of Brescia in 1698.

Pope Innocent XII created him cardinal during the consistory of 14 November 1699. He is abbot commendatory of Rosazzo. Delfin participates in the conclave of 1700, during which Clement XI is elected.

References

1653 births
1704 deaths
17th-century Italian cardinals
18th-century Italian cardinals
17th-century Roman Catholic bishops in the Republic of Venice
18th-century Venetian people
Apostolic Nuncios to France